Dean L. Buntrock is an American businessman and philanthropist most well known for his founding and longtime leadership of Waste Management, Inc., North America's largest waste services company. Over his 40-year career he increased revenue from $1 million to $9 billion .

Early years 
Born in Columbia, South Dakota, on June 6, 1931, Buntrock began learning about business as a youngster working for his father, Rudy Buntrock, a community leader who owned a farm services business that included International Harvester farm equipment, tractors and trucks, along with Standard Oil products, hardware and other farming-related needs. He was mayor of the 250-resident town for 25 years, a main customer of the local bank as well as a member of its board, and owner of a local baseball club. He led campaigns to build the local gym and fund War Bonds. Rudy's businesses, banking background and his ability to work with local farmers who purchased agricultural equipment taught Dean valuable lessons about how to purchase and finance equipment, which later proved to be very important during his early years in business.  Guided by his father and mother, Lillian (née Hustad), Dean at an early age displayed signs of entrepreneurial acumen, raising chickens and growing potatoes which he sold to local restaurants in the Aberdeen area about 20 miles away. At age 14, he drove a truck hauling grain during harvest for the area's largest farmer and at 16 became a salesman for his father's business.

Education 
Buntrock's early education was based on the Midwest Christian values that were the backbone of his mother's Norwegian and father's German heritage. He was raised a Lutheran. “The values that were most important to my parents were tithing, saving, respect and using all your God-given talents to pursue excellence,” Buntrock said. He attended the one-room St. John's Lutheran School from grades five through eight. It was across the street from the home he shared with his parents and younger siblings, a brother, Clayton, and a sister, Joyce. “If you were a Lutheran, that’s where you went,” he said. The school had 30 students; his high school class would have just eight graduates. His education continued at St. Olaf College in Northfield, Minnesota, where he majored in business and history. He returned home in his junior year to help with the family business when his father developed heart disease. After completing service during the Korean War, which included attending finance school at Fort Benjamin Harrison, he returned to St. Olaf to complete his college studies in 1955.

Entry into waste services 
Two days after graduation, Buntrock married Elizabeth (Betty) Joanne (“B.J.”) Huizenga, also a student at St. Olaf. The couple set off to Boulder, Colorado, where Dean became a successful, if short-lived, life insurance salesman for the Equitable Life Assurance Society of New York, earning commissions on life-insured home refinancings. B.J.’s father, Peter, was the son of Harm Huizenga, a Dutch immigrant who arrived in Chicago at the time of the World's Columbian Exposition in 1893. He owned a modest business at the beginning driving a horse and wagon full of trash for $1.25 a load. Harm and many other men of Dutch descent in Chicago – the names included Evenhouse, Groot, Boersma, DeBoer and others – would expand their businesses as the city grew. The work was hard and few lived long lives. Harm’s sons, Siert (Sam), Tom and Peter, followed their father's lead and built their own trash hauling businesses. Tom died in 1945 and Sam died in 1953. Peter died in September 1956 after suffering a heart attack. At this time, the business was known as the Ace Scavenger Service – a conglomeration of trash hauling companies owned in partnership with the Huizenga widows. On Peter's death, Buntrock returned to Chicago to care for his mother-in-law's interest in the Ace business. He came on as the manager with no stake in the business. Then in early 1957, only four months after his arrival, Lawry Groot, a partner who persuaded Dean to join the business, also died of a heart attack. That left the young Buntrock in charge. According to Timothy Jacobson’s history of the company, “Waste Management, A Corporate American Success Story,” Ace had just 15 collection routes, each with revenues of $4,000 a month, and an interest in a waste incinerator called Incinerator Inc. Buntrock brought home $200 a week.

Waste Management

Founding 
Over the next decade, Buntrock continued to grow the business, doubling its revenues every three years. He expanded to Milwaukee in 1959, acquiring Acme Disposal in a trade for some Chicago collection routes and added Wheeling, Illinois residential routes the same year. He acquired a landfill in 1967 in Brookfield, Wisconsin. Buntrock soon connected with Wayne Huizenga, his wife's first cousin who operated Southern Sanitation Services, a small but fast-growing garbage hauling business in Broward County, Florida begun in 1962. In 1967, Buntrock and Huizenga became partners when Buntrock purchased Huizenga's former father-in-law's one-third interest in Southern and assumed responsibility for financing its growth. In 1968, Buntrock incorporated Waste Management Inc. His goal was to organize a single holding company to bring together the disparate operations that he and Wayne Huizenga had cobbled together. At that time, the hauling companies and disposal sites in Chicago, Milwaukee and south Florida had operated as independent privately owned companies. The name, Waste Management, Inc., was Buntrock's idea, according to historian Jacobson. Buntrock had seen a reference to solid waste management equipment in a trade publication and, dropping the word "solid", he thought the name Waste Management captured his vision of the company's services and future. Buntrock knew that Waste Management needed to operate on a larger scale in order to attract future investors. In late 1970, in a series of transactions handled by his brother-in-law, Peter Huizenga (a young lawyer in Chicago), Buntrock's vision was put into action. The new Waste Management Inc. acquired all of the Buntrock managed businesses in Illinois, Wisconsin and Minnesota along with Wayne Huizenga's Florida business. A third founding partner, Larry Beck (Buntrock knew from the Chicago Ash and Scavenger Association) merged his Atlas Disposal businesses which operated on Chicago's south side into Waste Management. At the same time, Waste Management acquired the CID Landfill, a 150-acre disposal facility on the Chicago/Calumet City border which Buntrock had developed and opened in 1967. This would become a major company asset for many years to come. On January 1, 1971 these three founding partners, Buntrock, Huizenga and Beck, officially began business together under the new Waste Management brand.

Initial public offering 
Buntrock and his partners had been supporting their companies’ early growth with borrowings from community banks in Berwyn, Cicero and Oak Park, Illinois. They were paying for equipment on time, sending in payments with loan book remittance slips. But Buntrock envisioned that their operations would one day go public. He was not the first to do so. Browning-Ferris Industries (BFI) had gone public in 1969 and pioneered the industry's arriving consolidation, providing a path for Buntrock to follow. Buntrock brought in expert financial help to better organize the company. He had dealt with a number of banks and secured a $6 million credit line from the Continental Illinois National Bank and Trust Company of Illinois, but a public offering was needed to provide the capital and support the growth they foresaw coming. Waste Management, with The Chicago Corporation as its lead underwriter, went public on June 17, 1971, approximately 19 months after the creation of the United States Environmental Protection Agency on December 2, 1970. The offering was for 320,000 shares at $16 per share, raising approximately $4 million. At the end of 1971, Waste Management revenues were nearly $17 million and earnings $1.3 million. A second offering a year later raised an additional $25 million in equity capital. Its IPO prospectus noted that Waste Management served 8,000 commercial and industrial customers in Illinois, Indiana, Wisconsin and Florida and over 30,000 residential customers in Illinois, Indiana and Wisconsin. It operated 29 landfills in Florida, Illinois, Minnesota and Wisconsin. It had approximately 400 employees.

Expansion 
Over the next 25 years, Buntrock and his team led Waste Management's expansion across North America. The company's capabilities gradually grew to include the full range of recycling and solid waste services, hazardous wastes management services, waste-to-energy capability, clean water technologies, and environmental engineering. For a time, it expanded internationally, introducing municipal cleaning services in Saudi Arabia, and serving customers in more than 20 countries in Europe, South America, Asia, Australia and New Zealand. Buntrock retired as CEO at age 65 in 1996 at which time the company had grown to more than $9 billion in annual revenues.

Colleagues 
A group of executives who launched successful careers as part of the Buntrock team at Waste Management went on to capture additional achievements once their Waste Management days were over. Wayne Huizenga, Larry Beck (and his son Scott Beck), and retired Waste Management Chief Financial Officer Don Flynn and other former executives and associates invested in and led the development of the Blockbuster Video chain. Members of this group further developed such well-known corporate names as Boston Chicken (now Boston Market), Discovery Zone, H2O Plus, AutoNation, Extended Stay America and LKQ.  All received Buntrock's support and, in most cases, his investment.

Industry founder 
Buntrock and other Chicago haulers understood the value of having a local trade organization. First called the Chicago and Suburban Ash and Scavenger Association, the group evolved to become the Chicago and Suburban Refuse Disposal Association. It gave the haulers an industry voice and means to communicate with local governments from which they sought collection contracts. Buntrock further recognized the need for a national association. He emerged as the leader of the National Council of Refuse Disposal Trade Associations, founded in 1962. Buntrock, Harold Vandermolen, another Chicagoan, and Marshall Rabins from California each contributed $5,000 to engage a lawyer to incorporate the small group. Buntrock was its first president. His plan brought together entrepreneurs in waste management into an association that had size, experience and the know-how to play a role in developing new waste practices and introducing new waste management technologies. The association focused on recruiting new members and began monitoring developments in labor law, public health and trade practices. As it  began to reach out to federal government agencies, its leaders recognized they needed a more formally organized national voice. Buntrock hired a small Washington public relations firm, Larry Hogan Associates, to manage the group. Harold Gershowitz, a partner in the firm, became the association's first executive director. In 1968, the association was renamed the National Solid Wastes Management Association. Founder Buntrock served as its president through the mid-1960s and remained a director for nearly 20 years.

Philanthropy 
Buntrock has been a generous benefactor for numerous institutions, including his alma mater St. Olaf College, the Lutheran Church in America, the Chicago Symphony Orchestra, numerous arts organizations, and to conservation and environmental groups such as Ducks Unlimited and the National Wildlife Federation, the last of which he served as a director. In 1996 he contributed $26 million to St. Olaf College, the largest single gift donated to the school or any other Lutheran college in the United States. The money was the lead gift to build a new student center which opened on November 5, 1999. Named the Buntrock Commons in honor of Buntrock and his family, the building is a community center housing services to support student academic and social lives. Buntrock served as chair of the St. Olaf Board of Regents from 1986 to 1995. In 2018 Buntrock contributed $21.4 million to Luther Seminary in St. Paul, Minnesota, the largest single gift in its history. The gift funded a pilot program designed to allow the seminary to educate and train students in two years, instead of the four years typically needed for a master's degree in divinity. The gift was to reduce the cost to students and lower college debt, which has been a detriment to seminary school enrollment. Buntrock philanthropy has supported numerous Chicago civic and cultural institutions. A life trustee of the Chicago Symphony Orchestra, Buntrock funded the development of the CSO's Symphony Center, a multi-use facility used for rehearsals by the Chicago Symphony Chorus and Civic Orchestra of Chicago. The facility is used for chamber performances, dinners, receptions, lectures, trade shows and meetings. He was a founding board member and contributor to Chicago's Millennium Park. He served as a member of the Terra Foundation for American Art board and played a key role in filing a lawsuit with other board members that resulted in keeping the Terra Museum in Chicago. Buntrock has supported a range of health institutions, including Chicago's Rush University Medical Center, the Lurie Children's Hospital and the Eisenhower Medical Center in Rancho Mirage, California.

Personal life 
Buntrock has three daughters from his marriage to B.J. Huizenga and six granddaughters. The marriage to Huizenga, who died in 2014, ended in divorce. In 1984, Buntrock married Rosemarie Nuzzo.

Awards 
Buntrock is a 1996 recipient of the Horatio Alger Award. The award recognizes “contemporary role models whose experiences exemplify that opportunities for a successful life are available to all individuals who are dedicated to the principles of integrity, hard work, perseverance and compassion for others.” Buntrock was a 1992 inductee into the Sales & Marketing Executives International Academy of Achievement, established to recognize notable lifetime contributions to the free enterprise system through personal and corporate success in sales and marketing. In 1997, he was named outstanding chief executive in the pollution control industry by Financial World and The Wall Street Transcript. He is a 2007 inductee into the National Solid Wastes Management Association Hall of Fame.

SEC Settlement 
In August 2005, The U.S. Securities and Exchange Commission announced that it had reached a settlement with Mr. Buntrock and three other former Waste Management executives to resolve a civil complaint issued in 2002. The complaint alleged inappropriate accounting that resulted in overstating the company's profits during a five-year period in the mid-1990s. The SEC alleged that Mr. Buntrock and the executives were responsible for the loss in over $6 billion in shareholder value. Mr. Buntrock and the former executives admitted to no wrongdoing but agreed to a range of financial and other penalties to resolve the matter.

References 

Living people
Buntrock, Dean
Waste managers
St. Olaf College alumni
1931 births